Events in the year 2019 in Papua New Guinea.

Incumbents
Monarch: Elizabeth II 
Governor-General: Bob Dadae
Prime Minister: Peter O'Neill

Provincial Governors
 Central: Robert Agarobe
 Chimbu: Micheal Dua Bogai
 East New Britain: Nakikus Konga
 East Sepik: Allan Bird
 Enga: Peter Ipatas
 Gulf: Chris Haiveta
 Hela: Philip Undialu
 Jikawa: William Tongamp
 Madang: Peter Yama
 Manus: Charlie Benjamin
 Milne Bay: Sir John Luke Crittin, KBE
 Morobe: Ginson Saonu
 New Ireland: Julius Chan
 Oro: Gary Juffa
 Sandaun: Tony Wouwou
 Southern Highlands: William Powl
 West New Britain: Sasindran Muthuvel
 Western: Taboi Awe Yoto
 Western Highlands: Paias Wingti

Events

 23 November to 7 December – The non-binding 2019 Bougainvillean independence referendum showed that more than 98% of valid ballots cast were in favor of independence.
 6 December – The inauguration of Port Moresby Power Station.

Deaths

12 January – Christian Conrad Blouin, Roman Catholic prelate, Bishop of Lae (b. 1941).
11 December – Albert Toro, actor, director and politician.

References

 
2010s in Papua New Guinea
Years of the 21st century in Papua New Guinea
Papua New Guinea
Papua New Guinea